Nicholas Grant Dean  (born 1952) is a leading  Australian sport administrator and wine industry consultant. Dean has made a significant contribution to the Australian Paralympic movement.

Personal

Dean's father Henry who died in 2008 was born in India, fought in World War II and was a ski instructor.  Dean has three children and lives in Adelaide.

Business career
Dean became involved in the Australian wine industry through his father. His family has vineyards in the Adelaide Hills and is a major supplier of grapes to Petaluma Wines (Lion Nathan). He is chair of Project Wine, which provides "crush" services. He is currently employed by Colliers International as a specialist consultant to the Australian wine industry. Dean has stated that Colliers has provided support to allow him to dedicate time to the Paralympic movement.

Skiing

Dean's  involvement in skiing was through his father Henry who took him to the Australian Alps in 1963. In 1972, after completing university, Dean moved to Thredbo Ski Resort to work as a ski instructor. He was a ski instructor for ten years working in United States ski resorts during the Australian summer. Whilst working at Thredbo he became involved with people skiing with a disability including Ron Finneran. In 1978, he was at the inaugural meeting to establish the Australian Disabled Skiers Federation (ADSA) which was later called Disabled Winter Sport Australia. He was President of Disabled WinterSport Australia from 1990 to 2004 and 2008-2009, Treasurer from 2005 to 2007. In 1975, a founding member and the first Vice President of the Australian Professional Ski Instructors Association, a position he held between 1975 and 1980. Since 2007, he has been a member of the International Paralympic Committee (IPC) Alpine Skiing Sport Technical Committee.

Australian Paralympic Committee
In 1992, he joined the Board of the Australian Paralympic Committee, a position that he has held continuously except for 1995. He was Vice-President from 2000 to 2013. He was Chef De Mission for the Australian Winter Paralympic Games teams that competed at the 1994 Lillehammer Games, 1998 Nagano Games, 2002 Salt Lake City Games and Assistant Chef de Mission at Australian Winter Paralympic Games teams at 1992 Albertville Games, 2006 Torino Games, 2010 Vancouver Games and Australian Summer Paralympics teams at 2004 Athens Games and 2008 Beijing Games. In 2005, the Committee awarded him the Paralympic Medal for his commitment to sport for people with a disability.

In February 2017, he was appointed Chef de Mission for Australian Team at the 2018 Winter Paralympics.

Recognition
Dean has been recognised for his work, receiving several awards including:
2000 - Australian Sports Medal
2002 - Contribution to Skiing Award, Australian Ski Federation 
2005 - Paralympic Medal in 2005 for his commitment to sport for people with a disability. 
2014 - Medal of the Order of Australia 
2015 - Australian Paralympic Medal

References

External links
Nick Dean interviewed by Mick Fogarty in the Australian Centre for Paralympic Studies Oral History Project, National Library of Australia, 2013

Recipients of the Medal of the Order of Australia
Living people
1952 births
Paralympics Australia officials